Sphegina montana is a species of hoverfly from Central and Northern Europe. It is absent from Great Britain and Ireland. The face is normally all black; body length is 5–6 mm.

References

Eristalinae
Diptera of Europe
Insects described in 1921
Taxa named by Theodor Becker